Woodruff may refer to:

People
Woodruff (surname)
Woodruff (given name)

Places
In the United States:

Buildings
 Woodruff Hall, Athens, Georgia
 Charles Woodruff House (disambiguation), several places
 Woodruff-Riter-Stewart Home, Salt Lake City, Utah

Communities
 Woodruff, Arizona
 Woodruff, Idaho
 Woodruff, Indiana
 Woodruff, Kansas
 St. Charles, Kentucky, formerly known as Woodruff
 Woodruff, Missouri
 Woodruff, South Carolina
 Woodruff, Utah
Woodruff, West Virginia
 Woodruff, Wisconsin, a town
 Woodruff (community), Wisconsin, an unincorporated community
 Woodruff Place, Indianapolis, Indiana

Engineering 
 Woodruff key, a type of key used on machinery

Counties
 Woodruff County, Arkansas

Parks and preserves
 Lake Woodruff National Wildlife Refuge, Florida
 Woodruff Park in downtown Atlanta, Georgia

Schools
 Woodruff High School (Peoria, Illinois)
 Woodruff High School (Woodruff, South Carolina)

Streams
 Woodruff Creek, in San Mateo County, California

Plants
Galium odoratum, a herbaceous perennial plant
Asperula, a genus of herbaceous plants

Other uses
 Woodruff Electric Cooperative, Arkansas, USA
 The Bizarre Adventures of Woodruff and the Schnibble, a French adventure game